Sheikh Khalaf al-Ulayyan (also transliterated as al-`Ulya) is an Iraqi politician and the leader of the Sunni Islamist-led Iraqi National Dialogue Council. The council joined the Iraqi Accord Front to contest the December 2005 general election. In April 2006  the Front nominated Ulayyan for the post of deputy prime minister. He was granted the title of General prior to his withdrawal from the military.

Quotes

References

External links
Iraq: President takes lead to resolve political crisis
rferl.org SHI'ITE opposition to AL-JA'FARI nomination growing
rferl.org Interview: Two Iraqi Legislators Comment On Al-Ja'fari Nomination

Living people
Year of birth missing (living people)
Members of the Council of Representatives of Iraq
Iraqi people of Arab descent
Iraqi Sunni Muslims
Iraqi National Dialogue Council politicians